This is a list of airlines in Somalia.

See also
List of defunct airlines of Somalia 
Transport in Somalia
List of airlines

References

Somalia
Airlines
Airlines
Somalia